Djer (or Zer or Sekhty) is considered the third pharaoh of the First Dynasty of ancient Egypt in current Egyptology. He lived around the mid 31st century BC and reigned for c. 40 years. A mummified forearm of Djer or his wife was discovered by Egyptologist Flinders Petrie, but was discarded by Émile Brugsch.

Name 
 
The Abydos King List lists the third pharaoh as Iti, the Turin King List lists a damaged name, beginning with It..., while Manetho lists Uenéphes. Jürgen von Beckerath in the Handbuch der ägyptischen Königsnamen (1999) translates the hieroglyphs of the name Djer as "Defender of Horus."

Length of reign 
Although the Egyptian priest Manetho, writing in the third century BC, stated that Djer ruled for 57 years, modern research by Toby Wilkinson in Royal Annals of Ancient Egypt stresses that the near-contemporary and therefore, more accurate Palermo Stone ascribes Djer a reign of "41 complete and partial years." Wilkinson notes that years 1–10 of Djer's reign are preserved in register II of the Palermo Stone, while the middle years of this pharaoh's reign are recorded in register II of Cairo stone fragment C1.

Reign 
Djer's reign was preceded by a regency controlled by Neithhotep, possibly his mother or grandmother.

The evidence for Djer's life and reign is:
 Tomb in Umm el-Qa'ab, Abydos
 Seal prints from graves 2185 and 3471 in Saqqara
 Inscriptions in graves 3503, 3506 and 3035 in Saqqara
 Seal impression and inscriptions from Helwan
 Jar from Turah with the name of Djer
 UC 16182 ivory tablet from Abydos, subsidiary tomb 612 of the enclosure of Djer
 UC 16172 copper adze with the name of Djer
 Inscription of his name (of questioned authenticity, however) at Wadi Halfa, Sudan

The inscriptions, on ivory and wood, are in a very early form of hieroglyphs, hindering complete translation, but a label at Saqqarah may depict the First Dynasty practice of human sacrifice. An ivory tablet from Abydos mentions that Djer visited Buto and Sais in the Nile Delta. One of his regnal years on the Cairo Stone was named "Year of smiting the land of Setjet", which often is speculated to be Sinai or beyond.

Manetho claimed that Athothes, who is sometimes identified as Djer, had written a treatise on anatomy that still existed in his own day, over two millennia later.

Family 

Djer was a son of the pharaoh Hor-Aha and his wife Khenthap. His grandfather was probably Narmer. Djer fathered Merneith, wife of Djet and mother of Den. Women carrying titles later associated with queens such as Great One of the Hetes-Sceptre and She who Sees/Carries Horus were buried in subsidiary tombs  near the tomb of Djer in Abydos or attested in Saqqara. These women are thought to be the wives of Djer and include:

 Nakhtneith (or Nekhetneith), buried in Abydos and known from a stela.
 Herneith, possibly a wife of Djer. Buried in Saqqara.
 Seshemetka, buried in Abydos next to the king. She was said to be a wife of Den in Dodson and Hilton.
 Penebui, her name and title were found on an ivory label from Saqqara.
 bsu, known from a label in Saqqara and several stone vessels (reading of name uncertain; name consists of three fish hieroglyphs).

Tomb 

Similarly to his father Hor-Aha, Djer was buried in Umm el-Qa'ab at Abydos. Djer's tomb is tomb O of Petrie. His tomb contains the remains of 318 retainers who were buried with him. At some point, Djer's tomb was devastated by fire, possibly as early as the Second Dynasty. During the Middle Kingdom, the tomb of Djer was revered as the tomb of Osiris, and the entire First Dynasty burial complex, which includes the tomb of Djer, was very important in the Egyptian religious tradition. An image of Osiris on a funerary bier was placed in the tomb, possibly by the Thirteenth dynasty king Djedkheperu.

Several objects were found in and around the tomb of Djer:

 A stela of Djer, now in the Cairo Museum probably comes from Abydos.
 Labels mentioning the name of a palace and the name of Meritneith.
 Fragments of two vases inscribed with the name of Queen Neithhotep.
 Bracelets of a Queen were found in the wall of the tomb.

In the subsidiary tombs, excavators found objects including stelae representing several individuals, ivory objects inscribed with the name of Neithhotep, and various ivory tablets.

Manetho indicates that the First Dynasty ruled from Memphis – and indeed Herneith, one of Djer's wives, was buried nearby at Saqqara.

Gallery

See also 
 List of pharaohs
 Ancient Egyptian retainer sacrifices

References

Bibliography 
 Toby A. H. Wilkinson, Early Dynastic Egypt, Routledge, London/New York 1999, 71-73
 Toby Wilkinson, Royal Annals of Ancient Egypt: The Palermo Stone and Its Associated Fragments, (Kegan Paul International), 2000.

External links 

 
31st-century BC Pharaohs
30th-century BC Pharaohs
Pharaohs of the First Dynasty of Egypt
Hor-Aha